Pomacea hollingsworthi is a South American species of freshwater snail with gills and an operculum, an aquatic gastropod mollusc in the family Ampullariidae, the apple snails.

Distribution
The native distribution of P. hollingsworthi is Colombia. It was described from fifteen specimens, collected in a swiftly flowing stream with a rocky bed near Bogota in February 1939.

References

hollingsworthi
Freshwater snails
Gastropods described in 1946
Molluscs of South America
Invertebrates of Colombia